Monaco first participated at the Olympic Games in 1920, and has sent athletes to compete in most Summer Olympic Games since then, missing only the 1932 Games, the 1956 Games, and the boycotted 1980 Games. Monaco has also participated in every Winter Olympic Games since 1984.

As of 2022, no athlete from Monaco has ever won an Olympic medal, meaning the principality has the most appearances at the Olympics (32, including 21 summer and 11 winter) without ever making it to the podium (Julien Médecin did win a bronze medal for architecture at the 1924 Olympics, but the IOC no longer considers art competition medals as part of the official tally). Their best-ever finish has been sixth place in two-man bobsleigh at the 2022 Winter Olympics.

The National Olympic Committee for Monaco was created in 1907, but not recognized by the International Olympic Committee until 1953.

Medal tables

Medals by Summer Games

Medals by Winter Games

See also
 List of flag bearers for Monaco at the Olympics
 :Category:Olympic competitors for Monaco

References

External links
 
 
 

 
Olympics